Alexandra Culvin (born 16 November 1983) is an English sports management lecturer and former women's footballer. As a footballer, Culvin played for Leeds, Everton, Doncaster Bellees, AZ Alkmaar, Bristol Academy, and Liverpool, and as an academic, she has worked as a lecturer at the University of Salford and Leeds Beckett University.

Football career
Culvin played predominantly as a full-back. In 2004, whilst Culvin was playing for Leeds, she was selected for the England women's under-21 squad. Culvin played for Leeds in the 2006 FA Women's Cup final against Arsenal. In 2009, whilst Culvin was playing for Everton, she was selected for the Great Britain women's football squad for the 2009 Universiade. Culvin later played for AZ Alkmaar in the women's Eredivisie, before signing for Bristol Academy in February 2011. She was sent off during Bristol Academy's 2012 FA Cup semi-final against Birmingham City. Culvin later played for Liverpool, before being released in October 2012. During her career, Culvin played in the UEFA Women's Champions League for Everton, AZ and Bristol Academy.

Academic career
Culvin was born in Merseyside. In 2009, she was studying at Liverpool John Moores University, and she also wrote a PhD thesis on professional women's football in the UK at the University of Central Lancashire. She has worked as a sports management lecturer at the University of Salford, and as a senior lecturer at Leeds Beckett University.

Culvin is a supporter of universal basic income, and believes that men's football clubs should also have a women's team, as it would help them with public relations. In 2020, she investigated the health effects on players of the FA Women's Super League becoming a fully professional league. She found evidence of fat shaming and eating disorders amongst players. During the COVID-19 pandemic, she was critical of the government's decision to suspend women's football , whilst men's football was allowed to continue.

Honours

Everton
FA Women's Cup (1): 2009–10

References

External links
 

English women's footballers
Everton F.C. (women) players
AZ Alkmaar (women) players
Bristol Academy W.F.C. players
Doncaster Rovers Belles L.F.C. players
1983 births
Living people
Women's association football fullbacks
Liverpool F.C. Women players
English expatriate women's footballers
Footballers from Liverpool
FA Women's National League players
Women's Super League players
Expatriate women's footballers in the Netherlands
English expatriate sportspeople in the Netherlands
Alumni of Liverpool John Moores University
English socialists
English feminists
Universiade bronze medalists for Great Britain
Universiade medalists in football
Medalists at the 2009 Summer Universiade
Alumni of the University of Central Lancashire
Academics of the University of Salford
Academics of Leeds Beckett University
Academics from Liverpool